Dennis Anthony Dove (born August 31, 1981), is a former pitcher for the St. Louis Cardinals.

Dove graduated from Irwin County High School in Ocilla, Georgia in 2000. He went on to Georgia Southern University and was drafted by the St. Louis Cardinals in the third round of the 2003 amateur draft and was signed on June 30, 2003.

References

External links

Major League Baseball pitchers
Baseball players from Georgia (U.S. state)
1981 births
Living people
Georgia Southern Eagles baseball players
People from Tifton, Georgia
St. Louis Cardinals players
Memphis Redbirds players
New Jersey Cardinals players
Palm Beach Cardinals players
Peoria Chiefs players
Peoria Saguaros players
Springfield Cardinals players
Swing of the Quad Cities players